Buchanan Street station was the least known of Glasgow's four main terminus railway stations, the other three being ,  and . It was to the north-west of Queen Street station and served the north of Scotland.

History 
Constructed in 1849 by the Caledonian Railway Company as its main terminus for the city, the original station buildings consisted of supposedly temporary wooden structures, which lasted until the 1930s. A goods station at the site opened in 1850. Services ran primarily northbound, to Aberdeen, Perth and Stirling and other destinations.

The station was earmarked for closure and replacement in the "Bruce Report" about how to redevelop Glasgow in the post-Second World War period. The plan included replacing Buchanan Street and Queen Street stations with a Glasgow North station on land including the site of Buchanan Street, but many times larger. There was also a similar scheme to replace Central and St Enoch stations with a Glasgow South station, but neither came to fruition.

This reprieve proved to be only temporary as the station was closed in 1966 as part of the rationalisation of the railway system devised by Richard Beeching, with most of its services running to Queen Street. The buildings were demolished in 1967. The  Buchanan Street tunnel that ran from just outwith the station to Sighthill still exists, but public access is prohibited.

Site
In 1975, British Rail constructed Buchanan House (later named 'ScotRail House' between January 1985 and April 1994) and Glasgow Caledonian University occupy the site of the station. The Station Bar, nearby, still exists.

References

Notes

Sources 

Disused railway stations in Glasgow
Railway stations in Great Britain opened in 1849
Railway stations in Great Britain closed in 1966
Former Caledonian Railway stations
Glasgow Buchanan Street
1849 establishments in Scotland
1966 disestablishments in Scotland